Markus Robam (born 11 February 1991) is an Estonian composer and singer songwriter. He has released three studio albums "Astir", "Monogram" and "In Crowds". Robam has been featured on festivals "Fundamento", Tallinn Music Week, Estonian Music Days, festival Pulsar in Copenhagen, festival "Segnali" in Perugia  and “Nuova Consonanza” Festival in Rome, Italy.

Robam has written original music for TV series, theatre and movies.

He was the lead singer and principal songwriter of the alternative pop band MID  and participated in the Estonian Song Contest 2011 with their debut single "Smile". Robam has taken part in composing competitions in Austria and the United States. Robam has performed as a solo artist Tojj.

He studied audiovisual composition in the Estonian Academy of Music and Theatre and is a member of Estonian Composers Union since 2015.

In 2012, Markus starred as Melchior Gabor in the Estonian original production of the musical Spring Awakening. He has co-starred as Markus Moorits in "Kutsar koputab kolm korda" by Elo Selirand in 2010 and as Ingmar in TV Series "Class: Life after".

Robam has written original music for short movie productions in Baltic Film, Media, Arts and Communication School.

He was the author of sound and music design and wrote original music for the opening ceremony of Estonian National Museum in 2016.

Television
In addition to writing the original theme song for Kahekõne Robam also wrote the theme songs for Pöörijoon, Rula ja ratas, Lennud unes ja ilmsi, Rändaja laul and music for the website Lastejaam. He has written original music for Kanal 2 TV-series Siberi Võmm, and wrote the theme song for the show Kontakt in the Estonian Public Broadcasting.

Theatre
Robam has composed original music for Pruutide kool, Tsepeliin, Skvottimine võhikutele, Karlsonson, and Tõeajastu lõpp. He wrote original music for the 2014 Rakvere theatre production Must prints and A Cool Million: the Dismantling of Lemuel Pitkin and Väike prints by NUKU theatre. His music has been described as "minimal... sad and atmospheric ..."

Robam released his second studio album "Monogram", which was a compilation of original music in 2018.

Notable works
In 2012, Robam wrote Angle to Angle  a composition for video, piano and eight speakers. In 2015 Piece of Mind, a composition for clarinet quintet and video premiered in Cinema Sõprus, Tallinn.

In july 2017 Robam won the first prize in Tartu town hall competition for carillon songs with his composition "Raekoja tants".

In 2019 Markus Robam was nominated for best music design and original music by Estonian Theatre Union with original music productions "Loodusjõud" (Von Krahl Theatre), "Üksi ja Esmeralda" (Theatrum), "Noored hinged" (NUKU Theater), "Südames sündinud" (Institute for Health Development) and "Elias maa pealt" (NUKU Theater).

Discography
Albums
 Astir (2016)
 Monogram (2018)
 Upside Down (2019)
 In Crowds (2020)
 Whitewash (2020)
 Spring Prints (2022)

EPs/Singles
Angle to angle (2012)
Lacuna (2016)

Original music for theatre
Pruutide kool (2011)
Gamaheh valem (2013)
Tsepeliin (2014)
Lemuel Pitkini demonteerimine (2015)
Must Prints (2015)
Skvottimine võhikutele (2015)
Karlsonson (2016)
Tõeajastu lõpp (2017)
Väike Prints (2017)
Eluaeg (2017)
Chagall: eraldikoos (2017)
Üksi ja Esmeralda (2017)
Mehed (2017)
Loodusjõud (2018)
Teatripäev (2018)
Noored hinged (2018)
Südames sündinud (2018)
Alice imedemaal (2018)
Naised (2018)
Elias maa pealt (2018)
Mulla all (2019)
Ööpiltnikud (2019)
Õnnelik tund (2019)
Kas te käite siin tihti (2019)
Whitewash (2020)
Vapruse värinad (2020)
Sirli, Siim ja saladused(2020)
Jääpüük (2021)
Miks me varastasime auto (2021)
Rock'arella (2021)
Mäletan/Ei mäleta (2021)
Ninasarvik (2021)
Sihtisid pole sel sillal (2022)
Sinel (2022)
Divide et Impera (2022)

Original music for film
Väljakutse (2012)
Vandenõu (2013)
Meeleseisund (2016)
Mehed (2019)
Sinine (2020)
A Call Above the Clouds (2020)
Raul Vaiksoo: Pätt või pühak (2021)

Original TV themes
Kahekõne (2013)
Rula ja ratas (2013) 
Suud puhtaks (2016)
Pöörijoon (2016)
Kontakt (2017)
Eesti mustrid (2017)
Reis ümber Eesti (2018)
Suud puhtaks (2020)
Spordisangarid (2021)
UV faktor (2021)

Original music for TV series
Siberi võmm (2017 - 2018)

References

External links 
 

1991 births
Estonian pop singers
21st-century Estonian male singers
People from Viljandi
21st-century Estonian composers
Living people